The 1975–76 Kentucky Wildcats men's basketball team represented University of Kentucky. The head coach was Joe B. Hall. The team was a member of the Southeast Conference and played their home games at Memorial Coliseum.

National Invitation Tournament
First Round
Kentucky 67, Niagara 61
Second Round
Kentucky 81, Kansas State 78
Semifinal
Kentucky 79, Providence 78
Final
 Kentucky 71, Charlotte 67

Awards and honors

Team players drafted into the NBA
No one from the Wildcats was selected in the 1976 NBA Draft.

References

Kentucky
Kentucky Wildcats men's basketball seasons
National Invitation Tournament championship seasons
Kentucky
Kentucky Wildcats men's basketball
Kentucky Wildcats men's basketball